Bear Creek Township is a township in Henry County, in the U.S. state of Missouri.

Bear Creek Township was established in 1873, taking its name from Bear Creek.

References

Townships in Missouri
Townships in Henry County, Missouri